Marcus Matthias Dackers (born 9 January 2003) is a Welsh professional footballer who plays for Woking, on loan from Salford City, as a striker.

Club career
Dackers played youth football with Manchester City and Brighton & Hove Albion. Whilst at Brighton he spent time on loan at Lancing. His Lancing debut came in a match on 6 February 2020 against Lingfield.

He signed for Salford City on a two-year contract in July 2021, and moved on loan to Stalybridge Celtic in October 2021. He scored eight goals in 10 games, and received comparisons to former Celtic loanee Dominic Calvert-Lewin. During his time at Celtic, he was managed by fellow Welsh striker Simon Haworth, who helped develop his game. Salford recalled Dackers on 12 November 2021. He made his debut for Salford City on 13 November 2021 in the league.

In January 2022 he joined Chester on an initial one-month loan, with manager Steve Watson describing it as a "natural progression" in his career. Dackers scored his first goal in a 5–0 win against Southport on 5 February, and later that month his loan was extended for a further month, and again in March until the end of the season. By March he had scored seven goals for the club in all competitions and said "I feel like I have come on and been improving in every single game. Now to get my first brace for the club was a great feeling".

Dackers moved on a month-long loan to Southend United in September 2022, and scored on his début against Chesterfield. Dackers said playing against league-leaders Chesterfield and Wrexham in his first two games was important to test himself as a player. Later that month Southend said they wished to extend the loan. He moved on loan to Woking in January 2023.

International career
He is a Wales youth international. He played schoolboy football for Wales before being called-up to the Under-17 squad.

Style of play
His manager at Chester, Steve Watson, described him as "a big lad but he is a good mover. You get people of that size and they can be immobile but he’s not. He is a good athlete".

Career statistics

References

2003 births
Living people
Welsh footballers
Wales youth international footballers
Brighton & Hove Albion F.C. players
Lancing F.C. players
Manchester City F.C. players
Salford City F.C. players
Stalybridge Celtic F.C. players
Chester F.C. players
Southend United F.C. players
Woking F.C. players
English Football League players
National League (English football) players
Northern Premier League players
Association football midfielders